Sebastián Vázquez (born 7 November 1990) is a Mexican professional golfer who currently plays on the Web.com Tour and PGA Tour Latinoamérica.

Amateur career
Vázquez had a successful amateur career winning the Mexican Amateur in 2011 and 2012.

He also represented Mexico at the 2012 Eisenhower Trophy as part of a team with Rodolfo Cazaubón and Carlos Ortiz. Vázquez won the individual prize helping the Mexican team to a second-place finish behind the United States.

Professional career
Vázquez turned professional in 2012 and immediately joined PGA Tour Latinoamérica, making his professional début at the Lexus Peru Open in November 2012. His first professional win came at the 2012 Puerto Rico Classic in just his second professional start on PGA Tour Latinoamérica.

Vázquez continued to play on PGA Tour Latinoamérica during the 2013 season but failed to win an event. He progressed through the Web.com Qualifying Tournament in 2013 to gain his playing rights on the Web.com Tour for 2014.

Amateur wins
 2011 Mexican Amateur
 2012 Mexican Amateur Championship, Eisenhower Trophy (individual prize)

Professional wins (8)

PGA Tour Latinoamérica wins (2)

Gira de Golf Profesional Mexicana wins (6)

Team appearances
Amateur
 Eisenhower Trophy (representing Mexico): 2012

References

External links
 
 

Mexican male golfers
PGA Tour Latinoamérica golfers
Sportspeople from Mexico City
1990 births
Living people
21st-century Mexican people